The Bundangcheon is a short stream in Bundang, South Korea.  Its source is the reservoir in Yul-dong Park and it then runs through Central Park (Jungang Park), under the main road through Bundang, past Bundang Gu Office, to join the Tancheon.

See also
Rivers of Korea
Geography of South Korea

References

Bundang
Rivers of South Korea